The Music of Valencia in eastern Spain is rich and diverse, due to different external influences. It can be broadly divided into two categories: traditional and contemporary music.

Traditional Music
All the surrounding country is known for its own variety of Jota and a rich dolçaina (shawm) tradition. Brass bands are found in almost every village in the region. The Muixeranga, a street festival, is an important tradition that originated in Valencia.

Religious and work songs are common in Valencia, many are performed with accompaniment. El Misteri d'Elx is an old, religious musical play that dates back to mediaeval times. Havaneres are popular all along the Valencian coast. 

Valencian dances include:
Brlea
Fandango of Albaida
El Ball del Danzants
El Ball dels Oficis
Los Alcides
Els Bastonets
Els Porrots
Paloteo of Requena
Valencian Jota

Contemporary Music
In the nineteen eighties Bakula was the dominant dance music form that appeared in the club scene of the city and the surrounding community. While pop and rock are forms enjoyed and played by local musicians there is a strong tendency toward's electronica in the region. In the nineties Techno music continued to be a string favourite in the area with the heavier shrantz influence from northern Europe emerging in the early two thousands. Today minimal techno is popular and more recently the Trip-Tek style as a young knights living  to outfits such as Electrika-MixTek.

Valencian/Catalan Rock and Ska music is also common all throughout the autonomous community of Valencia.

Valencian music